Munébrega is a municipality located in the province of Zaragoza, Aragon, eastern Spain.

References

Municipalities in the Province of Zaragoza